The cabinet of Nayib Bukele formed on 1 June 2019 to serve as President Nayib Bukele's cabinet from 1 June 2019 until 1 June 2024.

Ministers

See also 

Nayib Bukele

References 

Cabinets established in 2019
2019 establishments in El Salvador
Nayib Bukele
Bukele